The National Operational Intelligence Watch Officer's Network'' (NOIWON''') is a secure telephone conference-call system between major Washington national security watch centers:
National Military Command Center
National Military Joint Intelligence Center
State Department Operations Center
State Department Bureau of Intelligence and Research
CIA Operations Center
NSA Operations Center
 The White House Situation Room
U.S. Navy Multiple Threat Alert Center
It is used for rapid evaluation of breaking crises.

References

Military intelligence
Central Intelligence Agency
National Security Agency
Intelligence analysis